The 2013 Sheraton Hawaii Bowl was an American college football bowl game that was played on December 24, 2013, at Aloha Stadium in Honolulu. The twelfth edition of the Hawaii Bowl, sponsored by Sheraton Hotels and Resorts, featured the Boise State Broncos from the Mountain West Conference against the Oregon State Beavers from the Pac-12 Conference.  It was one of the 2013–14 bowl games that concluded the 2013 FBS football season.  It began at 3:00 p.m. HST (8:00 p.m. EST) and aired on ESPN. Oregon State defeated Boise State, 38–23.

Teams 
Oregon State leads the series with Boise State 4–3. Last meeting, Boise State defeated OSU 37-24 in 2010. The teams have never met in a bowl game.

Boise State 

Interim Head Coach is Bob Gregory after Chris Petersen decided to take over the job at Washington. Since 2000, the Broncos are the winningest football program in college 155–25 (.861), producing 38.8 points per game this year. The team, with 47 penalties this season, is ninth-nationally in fewest penalties per game (3.92) and is 18th-fewest in penalty yards per game (36.42).

Oregon State 

Junior wide receiver Brandin Cooks has won the 2013 Biletnikoff Award, as the nation's top college receiver. He set OSU records for career receiving touchdowns (23), single season touchdown receptions (15), single season receptions (120) and single season yards (1,670).

Game summary

Scoring summary

Statistics

References 

Hawaii Bowl
Oregon State Beavers football bowl games
Hawaii Bowl
Boise State Broncos football bowl games
Hawaii Bowl
December 2013 sports events in the United States
21st century in Honolulu